The 2022 French election may refer to:

The 2022 French presidential election, 10 and 24 April 2022
The 2022 French legislative election, 12 and 19 June 2022